Lisa Michelle Hicks-Thomas (born March 2, 1969) is a former Secretary of Administration of the Commonwealth of Virginia, serving under Governor Bob McDonnell. She was formerly a state deputy attorney general from 2007 to 2010 and assistant commonwealth's attorney in her native Chesapeake.

References

1969 births
Living people
State cabinet secretaries of Virginia
African-American state cabinet secretaries
African-American people in Virginia politics
Women in Virginia politics
University of Virginia alumni
William & Mary Law School alumni
African-American women in politics
21st-century American politicians
21st-century American women politicians
21st-century American lawyers
21st-century American women lawyers
Politicians from Chesapeake, Virginia
County and city Commonwealth's Attorneys in Virginia
African-American women lawyers
African-American lawyers